Copeland Park, also referred to as "The Lumber Yard", is a stadium in La Crosse, Wisconsin, USA. It is primarily used for baseball and is the home field of the La Crosse Loggers baseball team. The current stadium was built in 2003, although a substantially smaller baseball diamond existed at the site before the construction of the new ballpark. At the time of its construction, the stadium held approximately 2,000 people. However, the success of the Loggers prompted expansions to the grandstand, bringing the capacity to its current 3,550 people. The field dimensions are 325 ft. to left field, 365 ft. to center, and 315 ft. to right.

Upgrades
On May 10, 2012, the La Crosse Loggers and University of Wisconsin-La Crosse athletic department announced a partnership to allow for the UW-La Crosse baseball team to play at Copeland Park. In exchange, the venue had upgrades of an artificial turf infield, a videoboard addition to the scoreboard in left field and batting cages. UW-La Crosse began playing at Copeland Park in 2014.

Notable events
Copeland Park hosted the 2006 Northwoods League All-Star Game on July 12, 2006. The North Division defeated the South Division 3–2 in 11 innings in front of 3,413 fans, the second-largest crowd in the game's history.

See also
Pettibone Park (La Crosse)
Riverside Park (La Crosse)

References

External links
 Copeland Park at the La Crosse Loggers website

College baseball venues in the United States
Minor league baseball venues
Wisconsin–La Crosse Eagles baseball
Baseball venues in Wisconsin
Buildings and structures in La Crosse, Wisconsin
Tourist attractions in La Crosse County, Wisconsin
2003 establishments in Wisconsin
Sports venues completed in 2003